Kensington is an unincorporated community in southwestern Hanover Township, Columbiana County, Ohio, United States. Lying along U.S. Route 30 at its intersection with Ohio State Routes 9 and 644, it has a post office with the ZIP code 44427.

History
Kensington was originally called Mayville, and under the latter name was laid out in 1852 when the Cleveland and Pittsburgh Railroad was extended to that point.  A post office called Maysville was established in 1860, and the name was changed to Kensington in 1876. Besides the post office, Kensington had a train station, hotel, and country store.

Parks and recreation
Kensington is home to the Seven Ranges Scout Reservation, a nearly  camping reservation owned by the Buckeye Council of the Boy Scouts of America. It is composed of three camps with numerous campsites and recreational activities, including a lake and field sports ranges.

Education
Children in Kensington are served by the United Local School District. The current schools serving the community are:
 United Elementary School – grades K-5
 United Middle School – grades 6-8
 United High School – grades 9-12

Parts of the outerlying area served by the Kensington post office are included in the Carrollton Exempted Village School District and Southern Local School District.

References

Unincorporated communities in Ohio
Unincorporated communities in Columbiana County, Ohio
1852 establishments in Ohio
Populated places established in 1852